John Matthew MacLeod (October 3, 1937 – April 14, 2019) was an American basketball coach in the NCAA and the National Basketball Association, most notably with the Phoenix Suns. After coaching for the University of Oklahoma, MacLeod was hired to coach the Suns in 1973. In 1976, he led them to their second postseason in team history, which culminated with an appearance in the 1976 NBA Finals; he would lead the team to eight further postseason appearances in his tenure. In fourteen years, MacLeod led them to 579 wins, which is the most in franchise history.

Career
MacLeod was a star high school basketball player before playing at Bellarmine College.

MacLeod coached the Oklahoma Sooners men's basketball team for six years before being hired to coach the Phoenix Suns in 1973, a position he held until 1987. During this stint, MacLeod was named the head coach of the Western Conference All-Star Team in 1981. After his departure from Phoenix, MacLeod went on to coach the Dallas Mavericks and New York Knicks. In 1991, he was hired to be the head coach of the Notre Dame Fighting Irish, where he won Big East Coach of the Year in 1997. In 1999, MacLeod resigned from his position and returned to Phoenix for one season as an assistant coach. MacLeod spent three seasons as an assistant coach for the Denver Nuggets before ending his coaching career as an assistant for the Golden State Warriors.

MacLeod was inducted into the Indiana Basketball Hall of Fame in 2005 and to the Arizona Sports Hall of Fame in 2016.

MacLeod was inducted into the Phoenix Suns Ring of Honor on April 18, 2012, as the winningest coach in franchise history.

Head coaching record

NBA

|-
| align="left" |Phoenix
| align="left" |
|82||30||52|||| align="center" |4th in Pacific||—||—||—||—
| align="center" |Missed Playoffs
|-
| align="left" |Phoenix
| align="left" |
|82||32||50|||| align="center" |2nd in Pacific||—||—||—||—
| align="center" |Missed Playoffs
|-
| align="left" |Phoenix
| align="left" |
|82||42||40|||| align="center" |3rd in Pacific||19||10||9||
| align="center" |Lost in NBA Finals
|-
| align="left" |Phoenix
| align="left" |
|82||34||48|||| align="center" |5th in Pacific||—||—||—||—
| align="center" |Missed Playoffs
|-
| align="left" |Phoenix
| align="left" |
|82||49||33|||| align="center" |2nd in Pacific||2||0||2||
| align="center" |Lost in First Round
|-
| align="left" |Phoenix
| align="left" |
|82||50||32|||| align="center" |2nd in Pacific||15||9||6||
| align="center" |Lost in Conf. Finals
|-
| align="left" |Phoenix
| align="left" |
|82||55||27|||| align="center" |3rd in Pacific||8||3||5||
| align="center" |Lost in Conf. Semifinals
|-
| align="left" |Phoenix
| align="left" |
|82||57||25|||| align="center" |1st in Pacific||7||3||4||
| align="center" |Lost in Conf. Semifinals
|-
| align="left" |Phoenix
| align="left" |
|82||46||36|||| align="center" |3rd in Pacific||7||2||5||
| align="center" |Lost in Conf. Semifinals
|-
| align="left" |Phoenix
| align="left" |
|82||53||29|||| align="center" |2nd in Pacific||3||1||2||
| align="center" |Lost in First Round
|-
| align="left" |Phoenix
| align="left" |
|82||41||41|||| align="center" |4th in Pacific||17||9||8||
| align="center" |Lost in Conf. Finals
|-
| align="left" |Phoenix
| align="left" |
|82||36||46|||| align="center" |4th in Pacific||3||0||3||
| align="center" |Lost in First Round
|-
| align="left" |Phoenix
| align="left" |
|82||32||50|||| align="center" |5th in Pacific||—||—||—||—
| align="center" |Missed Playoffs
|-
| align="left" |Phoenix
| align="left" |
|56||22||34|||| align="center" |(fired)||—||—||—||—
| align="center" |—
|-
| align="left" |Dallas
| align="left" |
|82||53||29|||| align="center" |2nd in Pacific||17||10||7||
| align="center" |Lost in Conf. Finals
|-
| align="left" |Dallas
| align="left" |
|82||38||44|||| align="center" |4th in Pacific||—||—||—||—
| align="center" |Missed Playoffs
|-
| align="left" |Dallas
| align="left" |
|11||5||6|||| align="center" |(fired)||—||—||—||—
| align="center" |—
|-
| align="left" |New York
| align="left" |
|67||32||35|||| align="center" |4th in Atlantic||3||0||3||
| align="center" |Lost in First Round
|-class="sortbottom"
| align="left" |Career
| ||1364||707||657|||| ||101||47||54||

College

Personal
On April 14, 2019, McLeod died of complications from Alzheimer's disease.

References

External links
 BasketballReference.com: John MacLeod
 Indiana Basketball Hall of Fame Page

1937 births
2019 deaths
American men's basketball coaches
American men's basketball players
Basketball coaches from Indiana
Basketball players from Indiana
Bellarmine Knights men's basketball players
College men's basketball head coaches in the United States
Dallas Mavericks head coaches
Detroit Pistons announcers
High school basketball coaches in the United States
New York Knicks head coaches
Notre Dame Fighting Irish men's basketball coaches
Oklahoma Sooners men's basketball coaches
People from Clarksville, Indiana
People from New Albany, Indiana
Phoenix Suns assistant coaches
Phoenix Suns head coaches